Muscari botryoides is a bulbous perennial plant of the genus Muscari and one of a number of species and genera known as grape hyacinth. It is sometimes grown as an ornamental plant.

The flowers are close together, and are almost totally round. The lower fertile flowers point downwards, while upper ones, usually paler and sterile, point upwards. The flowers are bright blue with white lobes at the end in the wild species, but other colours are available, including white. M. botryoides is originally from central and south-eastern Europe, growing in open woodland and mountain meadows.

The name botryoides is derived from the appearance of a miniature cluster of grapes. M. botryoides is said to be much less invasive than species such as M. neglectum, nevertheless it is listed as invasive in Tennessee.

References
Notes

Sources
 
 Rainy Side Gardeners Muscari botryoides

External links
USDA Plants Profile: Muscari botryoides

botryoides
Garden plants
Plants described in 1753
Taxa named by Carl Linnaeus
Taxa named by Philip Miller